ITAA may refer to the following:

Income Tax Assessment Act 1997
Income Tax Assessment Act 1936
Information Technology Association of America
International Transactional Analysis Association
Internet and Technology Addicts Anonymous, a self-help group for people suffering from internet addiction disorder